Christopher Hanson (born 5 August 1985) is an English professional golfer currently playing on the European Tour.

Satellite tour career
In 2011, Hanson won three times on the PGA EuroPro Tour and topped the Order of Merit (season money leader). This top five finish earned him a spot on the Challenge Tour.

2014 season
Hanson qualified for the 2014 Open Championship, but missed the cut.

2015 season
At 2015 European Tour qualifying school, Hanson was the last player to earn his 2016 Tour card.

2016 season
In the 2016 season, he has played on the European Tour where he was the third day leader at the Trophée Hassan II.

In 2016, Hanson also played on the Challenge Tour where he finished tied for fourth at the Challenge de Madrid.

Professional wins (5)

PGA EuroPro Tour wins (4)

Jamega Pro Golf Tour wins (1)

See also
2015 European Tour Qualifying School graduates

References

External links

English male golfers
European Tour golfers
Sportspeople from Harrogate
Sportspeople from Huddersfield
1985 births
Living people